Walter Edmund Addison (January 23, 1863 – January 12, 1925) was an American lawyer and Democratic politician who served as a member of the Virginia Senate, representing the state's 20th district.

References

External links

1863 births
1925 deaths
University of Virginia alumni
Democratic Party Virginia state senators
Politicians from Richmond, Virginia
20th-century American politicians
Lawyers from Richmond, Virginia
19th-century American lawyers